Oligotoma is a genus of webspinners, insects in the order Embioptera, also known as Embiidina. The type species is Oligotoma saundersii and the type locality the Indian subcontinent. The males have wings but the females are flightless. Embiids are recognisable by the enlarged front tarsi, which contain a large number of silk glands that they use to spin the threads they use for building the tubes and galleries in which they live.

Species
The Embioptera Species File lists the following species:-

Oligotoma albertisi Navás, 1930
Oligotoma approximans Davis, 1938
Oligotoma aurea Ross, 1948
Oligotoma brunnea Ross, 1948
Oligotoma burmana Ross, 2007
Oligotoma davisi Ross, 1948
Oligotoma dharwariana Bradoo, 1971
Oligotoma falcis Ross, 1943
Oligotoma glauerti Tillyard, 1923
Oligotoma greeniana Enderlein, 1912
Oligotoma gurneyi Froggatt, 1904
Oligotoma hollandia Ross, 1948
Oligotoma humbertiana (Saussure, 1896)
Oligotoma inaequalis Banks, 1924
Oligotoma insularis McLachlan, 1877
Oligotoma josephii Bradoo, 1971
Oligotoma mandibulata Ross, 1948
Oligotoma maritima Ross, 1948
Oligotoma michaeli McLachlan, 1877
Oligotoma nigra Hagen, 1885
Oligotoma oculata Ross, 1948
Oligotoma saundersii (Westwood, 1837)
Oligotoma tillyardi Davis, 1936
Oligotoma ubicki Ross, 2007

References

Oligotomidae
Insect genera